Cerithiopsis nana is a species of minute sea snail, a marine gastropod mollusc in the family Cerithiopsidae.

The species was described by Jeffreys in 1867.

Distribution
This species occurs in the Mediterranean Sea off Italy and in the Atlantic Ocean off Portugal.

References

 Cecalupo A. & Robba E. (2010) The identity of Murex tubercularis Montagu, 1803 and description of one new genus and two new species of the Cerithiopsidae (Gastropoda: Triphoroidea). Bollettino Malacologico 46: 45-64

Gastropods described in 1867
nana